Scotland is the most mountainous country in the United Kingdom. Scotland's mountain ranges can be divided in a roughly north to south direction into: the Scottish Highlands, the Central Belt and the Southern Uplands, the latter two primarily belonging to the Scottish Lowlands. The highlands eponymously contains the country's main mountain ranges, but hills and mountains are to be found south of these as well. The below lists are not exhaustive; there are countless subranges throughout the country.

As of 2019, hundreds of thousands of people visit mountains in Scotland every winter and 130,000 climb to the summit of Ben Nevis every year.

Highlands

Scotland's main mountainous region can be broadly further split into the Northwest Highlands, the Grampian Mountains and the islands off the west coast. As the name implies, the NW Highlands begin at the suture north and west of the Great Glen and include 100 of the 282 Munros. The mountains found here are generally very rough and steep, but can also often provide walking on short grass. Long ridges are to be found on both sides of Glen Shiel in Kintail and more range-like mountains are to be found further north, such as in the Fannichs. The Torridon Hills are exceptionally well-regarded by hillwalking, scrambling and climbing communities; some of them, such as Beinn Eighe, are crowned by white quartzite, which gives a highly-distinctive appearance. The trend continues to the north, with larger caps of the white rock at Foinaven and Arkle. Some of these hills are made of Lewisian Gneiss, one of the oldest rocks on Earth. Many of the peaks within this region are isolated, particularly within Assynt and Sutherland, and, although sometimes smaller, possess a great grandeur. These include: Stac Pollaidh, Suilven, An Teallach and Maiden Pap. The southern portion of this area south of Glenfinnan consists of lower mountains of Corbetts and Grahams, but maintain the rough character of those found further north. The highest mountain in this area is Càrn Eige, also the second most prominent mountain in Britain, although twelfth by height.

Torridon, west and southwest of Kinlochewe
The Fannichs, north-east of Kinlochewe
 Dundonnel and Fisherfield Forest, north of Kinlochewe
 Knoydart, north-east of Mallaig
 The Mullardochs and Glen Affric, west of Cannich
 Assynt, north of Ullapool

The Grampians make up the bulk of Scotland's highlands and contain the highest peaks and largest ranges, extending south and east of the Great Glen down to the Highland Boundary Fault, occupying almost half of the country's land area. Some of the area is relatively low lying, but not necessarily without topographical character. These regions include the Kintyre peninsula, Knapdale and Mid Argyll on the west coast, as well as eastern Aberdeenshire and Moray on the east. Rannoch Moor is a well-known area of low-lying land in an area surrounded by very high mountains and usually harks travellers' entrance into the highlands. The partly-forested Cowal peninsula has hills of intermediate height and considerable cragginess. The Grampians has the highest number of distinct mountain ranges in Scotland, particularly towards the west in Lochaber, where the mountains have much steeper sides than those found easterly. The highest eastern ranges can be split primarily into the Monadhliath, the Cairngorms and the Mounth. Well-known mountains and hills are to be found here, such as Ben A'an, The Cobbler, Buachaille Etive Mòr, Bidean nam Bian, Schiehallion, Ben Macdui and Lochnagar. The highest mountain in this area is Ben Nevis, the highest mountain in Britain.

 The Arrochar Alps, north-west of Arrochar
 The Braes of Balquhidder, north-west of Callander
 Breadalbane, west and north of Killin
 Lorne, north-east of Oban
 Cowal, north-west of Greenock
 The Black Mount, north-west of Bridge of Orchy
 Glen Coe, east of Ballachulish
 The Mamores, south-east of Fort William
 The Grey Corries, east of Fort William
 The Monadhliath, west of Aviemore
 The Cairngorms, north and north-west of Braemar
 The Mounth, south-east of Braemar
 Bennachie, north-west of Aberdeen

The main mountainous islands of Scotland are Skye, Mull and Rùm in the Inner Hebrides and Harris within the Outer Hebrides, however Islay, Jura and, although separated from the Hebrides, Arran are all very well-regarded for their hills and mountains. Skye's Black Cuillin, composed of basalt and rough gabbro, is generally regarded as the most serious mountain terrain in Britain with bare rock, jagged in outline and steep cliffs and deep cut corries. Ropes are required for some summits and the area is host to the only Munro necessitating climbing apparatus, the In Pinn. The neighbouring Red Cuillin is composed primarily of granite and has more isolated, cone-shaped mountains of a slightly lesser height. Skye is also very well known for the Quiraing and its Old Man of Storr on the Trotternish peninsula. The isle of Rùm has its own Cuillin, also composed of gabbro but shorter, grassier; necessitating good scrambling ability, and a head for heights. Multiple characteristic smaller hills are to be found on the island as well. Although only having one Munro, Ben More, Mull is a very mountainous island in its centre with Grahams and lower hills. The walking here is not as precipitous as the latter but still requires good competence. Jura is best known by the Paps of Jura, three cone-shaped, quartzite hills which are home to the Isle of Jura Fell Race and necessitate a great deal of height gain despite their size. Smaller hills are to be found nearby to them and on the remote northern half of the island. Within the Outer Hebrides, the mountains of Harris dominate, providing a stark contrast to the flatness of Lewis. The four highest mountains here are separated from each other by deep valleys, however the areas highest mountain, An Cliseam, can be climbed via a short horseshoe route. South Uist, further south in the archipelago, also has small enjoyable mountains and hills. The final island of considerable concern is Arran, which has four Corbetts and one Graham. These mountains require considerable care in places and include the A'Chir ridge, an area well-regarded by climbers; a number of approaches and routes are possible, usually starting from Glen Rosa or Glen Sannox. The St. Kilda archipelago, 40-miles west-northwest of North Uist, is also worth mentioning, consisting of four exceptionally steep-sided islands and multiple sea stacks, all but one requiring special planning and authorisation to visit and almost all necessitating safety ropes. These islands are sought after by hill baggers. Scotland also has smaller islands with conspicuous summits not part of a range, such as Dùn Caan on Raasay. The highest point of this area is Sgùrr Alasdair.

 The Skye Cuillin
 The Quiraing
 The Rùm Cuillin
 Isle of Mull
 Paps of Jura
 An Sgùrr (Eigg)
 St. Kilda

Central Lowlands

The southern and eastern parts of Scotland are usually referred to as the Scottish Lowlands, but these areas also have significant ranges of hills, although these are lower than the Highland mountains. Because they are much closer to towns and cities, they are more popular for hill walking and rambling than the more distant mountains of the Highlands. The highest mountain in this area is Ben Cleuch.
Sidlaw Hills, north of Dundee but south east of the Highland Boundary Fault
Ochil Hills, east of Stirling
Kilpatrick Hills, north-west of Glasgow
Campsie Fells, north of Glasgow
Lomond Hills, east of Kinross
In addition to the main ranges, there are numerous individual hills in the Lowlands, often volcanic in origin. Many are known by the Scots word Law, meaning hill.

Southern Uplands

The Southern Uplands form a continuous belt of hills across southern Scotland from Dumfries and Galloway to the Scottish Borders, with the northern sections spilling into Ayrshire, South Lanarkshire and Lothian. These uplands are divided into several local ranges. The heartland of the Galloway Hills lies to the north of Loch Trool, and excellent walks start from the extensive car park by Bruce's Stane. The ranges within the Scottish Borders are somewhat bigger and flatter than in Galloway but are of a similar height and are just as remote. There are also isolated hills which do not fit into any specific range, such as Tinto and Cairnsmore of Fleet. The highest mountain in this area is Merrick.

Galloway Hills
Range of the Awful Hand
Dungeon Hills
Rhinns of Kells
Minnigaff Hills
Carsphairn and Scaur Hills
Lowther Hills
Moffat Hills
Pentland Hills
Moorfoot Hills
Manor Hills
Lammermuir Hills
Ettrick Hills
Cheviot Hills, which lie mostly in England and form part of the border between the two countries

Scotland's highest mountains

The ten highest mountains in Scotland are also the ten highest in the UK:

1. Ben Nevis (Beinn Nibheis), 4,411.1 ft (1,344.5 m)

2. Ben Macdui (Beinn Macduibh), 4,295 ft (1,309 m)

3. Braeriach (Am Bràigh Riabhach), 4,252 ft (1,296 m)

4. Cairn Toul (Càrn an t-Sabhail), 4,236 ft (1,291 m)

5. Sgòr an Lochain Uaine, 4,127 ft (1,258 m)

6. Cairn Gorm (An Càrn Gorm), 4,084 ft (1,244.8 m)

7. Aonach Beag, 4,049 ft (1,234 m)

8. Aonach Mòr, 4,004 ft (1,220.4 m)

9. Càrn Mòr Dearg, 4,003 ft (1,220 m)

10. Ben Lawers (Beinn Labhair), 3,983 ft (1,214 m)

Listings

Scottish peaks are categorised in the following hill lists. A peak may qualify for inclusion in more than one list.

 The Munros are the most significant hills in Scotland over 3,000 feet (914.4 m), according to original compiler Sir Hugh Munro. The list was first drawn up in 1891, and is modified from time to time by the Scottish Mountaineering Club (SMC). It currently comprises 282 peaks, following the demotion of Sgurr nan Ceannaichean in September 2009 and of Beinn a' Chlaidheimh in 2012.
 The Corbetts are hills in Scotland between 2,500 and 3,000 feet (762 and 914.4 m), with a relative height of at least 500 feet (152.4 m). The list is maintained by the SMC. There are currently 222 hills.
 The Grahams are hills in Scotland between 2,000 and 2,500 feet (609.6 and 762 m), with a relative height of at least 150 metres (492 ft). The list of hills fitting these criteria was first published by Alan Dawson in The Relative Hills of Britain. under the provisional name Elsies (LCs, short for Lesser Corbetts). They were later named Grahams after the late Fiona Torbet (née Graham) who had compiled a similar list around the same time. The SMC incorporated the list into Munro's Tables in 1997 but Dawson continues to maintain the list.  There were originally 224 Grahams, but the current total stands at 221 after Corwharn, Ben Aslak and Ladylea Hill were surveyed as falling short of 609.6 m
 The Donalds are hills in the Scottish Lowlands over 2,000 feet (609.6 m). The list was originally compiled by Percy Donald, and is maintained by the SMC. It comprises 89 summits and 51 subsidiary tops, giving a total of 140 hills.
 The Marilyns are hills in the British Isles that have a relative height of at least 150 m, regardless of distance, absolute height or merit. The list was compiled and is maintained by Alan Dawson. There are 1,216 Scottish Marilyns, see List of Marilyns in Scotland.

Injuries and deaths 
 Injuries and deaths from avalanches

See also

 Ben Nevis
 Buachaille Etive Mòr
 Geography of Scotland
 List of deaths on eight-thousanders
 List of mountains of the British Isles by height
 Lists of mountains and hills in the British Isles
 Lists of mountains in Ireland
 List of Munro mountains in Scotland
 List of Murdos (mountains)
 List of Corbetts (mountains)
 List of Grahams (mountains)
 List of Donald mountains in Scotland
 List of Furth mountains in the British Isles
 List of P600 mountains in the British Isles
 Mount Hood climbing accidents

References

External links 

 Scottish Mountaineering Club - The SMC maintain the lists of Munros, Munro Tops, Furths, Corbetts and Donalds. They also keep a record of Completionists.
 Walkhighlands – Features podcasts giving the correct pronunciation and place-name meanings, a 3D visualisation of every route, gradient profiles and route downloads for GPS devices.
 MunroMagic.com – Munro, Corbett and Graham descriptions, pictures, location maps, walking routes and weather reports.
 Hill Bagging - the online version of the Database of British and Irish Hills - Survey reports, the change control database and the GPS database are on Hill Bagging.
 The Munros and Tops 1891–1997 – Spreadsheet showing changes in successive editions of Munros Tables.
 Ordnance Survey Munro Blog - OS is Britain's mapping agency. They make the most up-to-date and accurate maps of the United Kingdom. They have also produced a blog on the Munros.
 Harold Street Munros Lists of GPS waypoints + Grid References for walking in UK mountains and hills in various GPS file formats.
 ScottishHills.com – Hillwalking forum with Munro, Corbett, Graham and Donald, Sub 200's log, maps and trip reports.

Bibliography
 

Accidents
Avalanches in the United Kingdom
Death in the United Kingdom
Mountaineering disasters
Mountaineering deaths
 
Marilyns of Scotland
Munros
Tourist attractions in Scotland